Anderson New Technology High School, typically known as "New Tech", is a public charter high school in the city of Anderson, California. Chartered by the Bill & Melinda Gates Foundation (along with a similar school in Napa, CA New Technology High School), it provides many academic and non-academic classes, and a growing number of extracurricular activities. Such as several sports teams, and a growing number of clubs and other activity groups. It is part of the Anderson Union High School District (AUHSD).

References

High schools in Shasta County, California
Charter high schools in California